Michael Alan Felger (born August 6, 1969) is a sports radio talk show host on WBZ-FM in Boston, co-hosting "Felger and Massarotti" with Tony Massarotti, a former columnist for the Boston Herald. He is also a television host for NBC Sports Boston, where he talks about sports as a co-host of the weeknight show "Boston Sports Tonight" with Michael Holley, and the host of pregame and postgame coverage for Boston Bruins (with Tony Amonte) and New England Patriots games (with Ty Law and Troy Brown).

Career
Originally from Milwaukee, Felger graduated from Boston University in 1992. Upon graduating, he worked as an intern with the Boston Herald. He later joined the paper on a permanent basis and became the lead reporter for the Boston Bruins from 1997 to 1999.  He then became their New England Patriots beat columnist, a position he held from 1999 to 2008.

Felger also hosted a sports talk radio show called The Mike Felger Show on 890 ESPN. The show ran from 2005 to 2008, at which time Felger left at the end of his contract. He moved on as an online columnist and fill-in host for Boston sports radio station WEEI while continuing his television work on Comcast SportsNet New England. Felger began to host the Felger and Mazz afternoon drive-time show with Tony Massarotti on 98.5 The Sports Hub upon its launch in August 2009. Felger signed a new multiyear deal with 98.5 The Sports Hub's parent company The Beasley Media Group in January 2018.

Personal life
Felger has lived and worked in the Boston area since 1988. He currently lives in Wellesley, with his wife, FOX 25 television anchorwoman Sara Underwood and their daughters, Emma and Tessa. Felger also owns a house on Nantucket where he and his family spend part of the summer.

Controversies
Always considered a controversial sports-reporter, on October 12, 2011, Felger was involved in an online feud with Heidi Watney, another local reporter, in which he claimed Watney had an affair with then Boston Red Sox catcher Jason Varitek. Watney responded via Twitter by questioning Felger's work ethic and integrity, and most media critics reprimanded Felger for being unprofessional.

On November 8, 2017, Felger said on Felger and Massarotti that former Major League Baseball pitcher Roy Halladay, who died in a plane crash, was a "moron" for partaking in such a dangerous activity when he was a father with young children. The comments led to a 3-day suspension from NBC Sports Boston (which runs a television simulcast of his radio show). He apologized the next day on the air.

Book
 Tales from the Patriots Sideline: A Collection of the Greatest Stories of the Team's First 40 Years, authored by Michael Felger, foreword by Steve Grogan, afterword by Bill Belichick, pictures by Jim Mahoney of the Boston Herald,

References

External links
 CBS Boston profile

1969 births
Living people
Radio personalities from Milwaukee
Sportswriters from Massachusetts
American sports radio personalities
Radio personalities from Boston
Sports in Boston
Writers from Milwaukee
Boston University College of Communication alumni
National Basketball Association broadcasters
Boston Celtics announcers